Atlantic City School District is a comprehensive community public school district in Atlantic City, in Atlantic County, New Jersey, United States. The district serves students in pre-kindergarten through twelfth grade.

As of the 2020–21 school year, the district, comprised of 11 schools, had an enrollment of 6,553 students and 617.3 classroom teachers (on an FTE basis), for a student–teacher ratio of 10.6:1.

Students from Brigantine, Longport, Margate City and Ventnor City attend Atlantic City High School as part of sending/receiving relationships with the respective school districts.

The district is classified by the New Jersey Department of Education as being in District Factor Group "A", the lowest of eight groupings. District Factor Groups organize districts statewide to allow comparison by common socioeconomic characteristics of the local districts. From lowest socioeconomic status to highest, the categories are A, B, CD, DE, FG, GH, I and J.

History
In 1948, students had choices to attend schools. That year Noma Jensen of the Journal of Negro Education stated the district had "loose boundary lines". In 1948, there were three schools earmarked to African-Americans with all of the teachers being African-American, and there was one African-American teacher at Atlantic City High School. This was in an era of de jure educational segregation in the United States.

Starting in 2014, the dissolution of some charter schools was a factor in an increase in the student population, despite a decline in casino jobs.

Schools
Schools in the district (with 2020–21 enrollment data from the National Center for Education Statistics) are:
Preschool
Venice Park School (36 students in PreK)
Jodi Burroughs, Principal 
Elementary schools
Brighton Avenue School (315 students; in grades PreK-5)
Dorothy Bullock-Fernandes, Principal
Chelsea Heights School (332; PreK-8)
Kenneth Flood, Principal 
Dr. Martin Luther King Jr. School Complex (543; PreK-8)
Jodi Burroughs, Principal 
New York Avenue School (548; PreK-8)
James Knox, Principal 
Pennsylvania Avenue School (549; PreK-8)
Lina Gil, Principal 
Richmond Avenue School (615; PreK-8)
Shelley Williams, Principal
Sovereign Avenue School (696; PreK-8)
Nicole Wiliams, Principal
Texas Avenue School (499; K-8)
LaKecia Hyman, Principal 
Uptown School Complex (536; PreK-8)
Dr. Ananda M. Davis, Principal
High school
Atlantic City High School (1,771; 9-12)
Constance Days-Chapman, Principal

Former schools

 Atlantic City High School East Campus (closing announced December 2014), 117 Indiana Ave.
 New Jersey Avenue School, (formerly segregated) 18 N. New Jersey Ave.

Pennsylvania Avenue School opened for the 2012-13 school year, with most students shifting from New Jersey Avenue School, which had been one of the district's oldest and most rundown schools.

Administration
Core members of the district's administration are:
Dr. La'Quetta Small, Superintendent
Celeste Ricketts, Business Administrator
Angela Brown, Board Secretary

Board of education
The district's board of education is comprised of nine members who set policy and oversee the fiscal and educational operation of the district through its administration. As a Type II school district, the board's trustees are elected directly by voters to serve three-year terms of office on a staggered basis, with three seats up for election each year held (since 2013) as part of the November general election. The board appoints a superintendent to oversee the district's day-to-day operations and a business administrator to supervise the business functions of the district.

References

External links
Atlantic City School District Website
 
School Data for the Atlantic City School District, National Center for Education Statistics

Atlantic City, New Jersey
New Jersey District Factor Group A
School districts in Atlantic County, New Jersey